The South Australian Railways I Class locomotive entered service on the South Australian Railways as No. 161 on 9 December 1910.

History
The engine was built by Beyer, Peacock and Company in 1888 and imported to Victoria, Australia. It initially worked on a private railway in Victoria, and was then sent to contractors "Waring and Rawdon" in 1903 for construction work at Outer Harbour, South Australia. After its private work years it was sold to the South Australian Government by the Engineer-in-Chief's Department. It officially entered service on the South Australian Railways on 9 December 1910 as No. 161. Between 1918-1919 it was then classified "I" and worked until 8 April 1929, then finally scrapped on 10 May 1930.

References

Broad gauge locomotives in Australia
I2
Beyer, Peacock locomotives
0-4-0ST locomotives